is a Japanese politician from Fukaya, Saitama.

After graduating from Teikyo University, Arai became an orthopedic surgeon. He was elected mayor of Fukaya with the backing of Liberal Democratic Party (LDP) and New Komeito Party (NKP) in 1999.

His younger brother Etsuji is an LDP member of the Diet of Japan.

References

Mayors of places in Saitama Prefecture
Japanese surgeons
1955 births
Living people